The Oran massacre of 1962 (5–7 July 1962) was the mass killing of Pied-Noir and European expatriates living in Algeria by members of the Algerian National Liberation Army. It took place in Oran beginning on the date of Algerian independence, and ended on 7 July 1962. Estimates of the casualties vary from a low of 95 (twenty of whom were European) to 365 deaths in a report by a group of historians sent to the French government in 2006, and has been utilised by right-wing parties. There is little information, both scholarly and generally, about the Oran massacre. The politics behind massacres means that the onus is unfairly often on the victims to bring it to the attention of academics and the wider public. However, given the pieds-noirs desire to present their time in Algeria as one of harmony, this has not happened.

Background

The Algerian War had been underway since 1954. The Évian Accords of 18 March 1962 brought an end to the conflict. The Accords, which were reached during a cease-fire between French armed forces and the Algerian nationalist organisation the Front de libération nationale (FLN), began the process of transfer of power from the French to the Algerians. The Évian Accords intended to guarantee the rights and safety of the pieds-noirs, French and Spanish colonial residents, many born in Algeria, and indigenous Sephardi Jews in an independent Algeria. However, the flight of French pieds-noirs and pro-French native Algerians began in April 1962, and by late May hundreds of thousands had emigrated from Algeria, chiefly to metropolitan France. In fact, within weeks, three-quarters of the pieds-noirs had resettled in France.

With armed conflict apparently at an end, the French government loosened security on Algeria's border with Morocco, allowing the FLN freer movement within Algeria. Independence had been bitterly opposed by the pieds-noirs and many members of the French military, and the anti-independence Organisation armée secrète (OAS) started a campaign of open rebellion against the French government, declaring its military to be an "occupying power". The OAS engaged in a bombing campaign that killed an estimated 10 to 50 Algerians in Oran daily in May 1962. the violence was so intense in Oran that people living in European neighbourhoods rapidly left them; some Muslims left Oran to join their families in the villages, or in cities that did not have a large European population. The OAS similarly declared a "scorched earth" policy to deny French-built facilities and development to the future FLN government, a policy that reached its climax on 7 June 1962 when the OAS Delta Commando burned Algiers Library and its 60,000 volumes and blew up Oran's town hall, the municipal library, and four schools. On June 25 and 26 1962, the OAS commandos attacked and robbed six banks.

It is no surprise that these events took place in Oran in particular. Oran was a particularly important place in French Algeria, and was the only city in North Africa to feature a bullring. This testifies not only to the highly European nature of the city, but also the city as a cite of violence and drama. In colonial Algeria, Oran stood out for its unique demography. In the 1931 census, over 80% of the inhabitants were reportedly European, a percentage that increased drastically after 1939 when a new wave of Spaniards migrated there to flee the Spanish Civil War. Violent conflicts had taken place in Oran since the end of the 19th century, particularly between different communities. In the 1930s, Oran's bullring became the central arena for the campaign for reform of Algerian institutions; and in 1936 and 1937, was home to strikes that shook the city of Oran. One incident between strikers and non-strikers during this period escalated to the point of police firing shots in the bullring, and, elsewhere in the city, police being attacked with stones. Talking about Oran during the interwar period, historian Claire Marynower described Oran as "a place where politics were transformed and radicalised, throwing into sharp local relief issues that concerned the whole French empire." Oran was fertile ground for the massacre to take place.

Event
On the morning of 5 July 1962, the day Algeria became independent, seven katibas (companies) of FLN troops entered the city and were fired at by some Europeans. An outraged Arab mob swept into the pied-noir neighbourhoods, which had already been largely vacated, and attacked the remaining pieds-noirs. The violence lasted several hours, during which the mob cut the throats of many men, women and children. The massacre was ended by the deployment of French Gendarmerie.

Neither the Algerian police nor the 18,000 French troops in the city intervened in the massacre. Their orders from Paris were "do not move", leaving the pieds-noirs vulnerable. Many pied-noirs believed that the massacre was an expression of policy by the FLN and chose to emigrate to France.

At the 1963 trial of Jean Bastien-Thiry, who attempted to assassinate President de Gaulle, defence lawyers referred to the Oran massacre. They said that Bastien-Thiry's act was justified because de Gaulle caused a genocide of Algeria's European population.

Estimates of the total casualties vary widely. This is not unique to the Oran massacre, as there are a multitude of challenges to identifying the amount of civilian killings. There are almost always wide discrepancies in the estimated figures even in small and localised cases.

 Dr. Mostefa Naït, the post-independence director of the Oran hospital centre, claimed that 95 persons, including 20 Europeans, were killed (13 from stabbings) and 161 people were injured with local newspapers giving figures in the 30 area in the days afterwards.
 A group of historians in 2006 suggested 365 were killed. 
 A local newspaper gives the figure of 1500 deaths with no detail and no source and there has been speculation of many thousands of deaths, with the former National Front Leader Jean-Marie Le Pen claiming a figure of 7,000 deaths.

The number killed has been a topic of debate for right-wing individuals in France in particular.

The Politics of Massacres and Uncovering them 
While massacres have occurred throughout recorded, and even pre-recorded, history, scholars have only recently turned their attention to the study of the massacre as a phenomenon separate from genocide. They can be either driven by official state policy, or can occur as a result of the state's lack of control, and thus without official state sanctions. That is what is the case in the instance of the Oran Massacre. While it was not a result of official state sanction, the French authorities failed to intervene despite being aware of the situation.

For a massacre to be uncovered, it either has to have a magnitude such that its existence cannot be ignored, or otherwise perpetrators, survivors, or bystanders must speak out about their experience. At other times, scholars have only learned about a massacre if they are later revealed in memoirs, letters, journals or oral accounts sometime after they have happened.

Generally speaking, the massacres involving French Algeria are well documented and known. However, three events in particular have been the focal point of colonial violence in Algeria: the massacres at Sétif and Guelma in May 1945; the deaths of Algerian protestors by the Paris police in October 1961; and the police killings of protestors at the Charonne metro station (Paris) in February 1962.

The Oran massacre is thus unique in the fact that other massacres in French Algeria, or relating to French Algeria, are widely known, begging the question: why is the Oran Massacre unknown? Since so much scholarship has focussed on the massacres mentioned here, it is possible that the Oran massacre has been overshadowed in the collective memory, particularly by the events in Paris earlier that same year.

Another forthcoming explanation, however, is that the surviving victims had a vested interest in keeping the incident quiet. Even before 1962, the pieds-noirs in Algeria felt alienated by metropolitan France, a feeling that was only exacerbated by the War of Independence, and subsequent resettlement of many pieds-noirs in France. The Europeans in Algeria were almost universal supporters of French Algeria, while those in France supported de Gaulle and independence. When the pieds-noirs arrived in France, their reception by metropolitan France was hostile. Their presence appeared to represent an economic burden, as they contributed to the strain on public services.

On the backdrop of this, the pieds-noirs in France were committed to cultivating a memory of French Algeria that was a utopia, in which the Europeans and Arabs lived harmoniously together. Of the many novels and memoirs on French Algeria by this group, tension and violence between Europeans and Muslims is completely absent; and they often insist that the war of 1954 was not between the French and the Muslims, but a civil war between Muslims loyal to France, and Muslims disloyal. It was within this framework that the pieds-noirs chose to forget the incident of 1962 in Oran.

See also
List of massacres in Algeria

References

Conflicts in 1962
1962 in Algeria
Algerian War
Massacres of ethnic groups
Massacres in Algeria
1962 in France
Mass murder in 1962
Massacres in 1962
Francophobia
Ethnic cleansing in Africa
Algerian war crimes
July 1962 events in Africa